A pilot major is a chief navigator of a ship or fleet. This person is usually experienced in naval exploration and has distinguished himself as both a sailor and a voyager. This term is mostly used to describe persons from early modern history. An example of a pilot major is Amerigo Vespucci.

Marine occupations